Malcolm Goldring  (1949-2021) was an English conductor and musical director.

Goldring studied the oboe at the Royal College of Music. He also graduated from Durham University in 1972 with a PGCE. In 1975 he founded the Midland Festival Chorus and was musical director of the Royal Leamington Spa Bach Choir from 1988 to 1995. He was awarded a Winston Churchill Fellowship in 1990, which allowed him to tour the United States and Canada studying the development of youth and children's choirs. On his return he was elected a Fellow of the Royal Society of Arts.

He has conducted most of the major British orchestras, including the BBC Philharmonic, Royal Liverpool Philharmonic, English Symphony Orchestra, and the Orchestra of the Swan. In 2014 he conducted the Philharmonia Orchestra at the Royal Albert Hall as part of a concert marking the 100th anniversary of the outbreak of the First World War.

Malcolm died after a short illness on 12 May 2021.

References

Living people
English conductors (music)
British male conductors (music)
Alumni of the Royal College of Music
Alumni of Hatfield College, Durham
21st-century British conductors (music)
21st-century British male musicians
1949 births